Tverrdalsøya is an island in Arendal municipality in Agder county, Norway.  The  island lies between the Oksefjorden, Eikelandsfjorden, and Kilsundet straits just off the mainland coast at the entrance to the Tvedestrandsfjorden which leads north to the town of Tvedestrand.  The island of Flostaøya lies immediately to the south and the island of Borøy lies immediately to the east.  The main population centre on the island is the village of Kilsund at the southern end of the island.  

Historically, the island was a part of the municipality of Dypvåg until 1902 when it was made a part of the new municipality of Flosta.  In 1962, it became a part of the new municipality of Moland and then in 1992 it became part of the municipality of Arendal.

See also
List of islands of Norway

References

Arendal
Islands of Agder